Rory Jennings (born 24 December 1995 in Oxford, England) is an English professional rugby union footballer. He plays at fly half for English club London Irish in Premiership Rugby. He previously played for English sides Coventry and Bath and French club Clermont Auvergne

References

External links
Premiership Rugby Profile
Bath Rugby Profile

Living people
1995 births
English rugby union players
Bath Rugby players
Jersey Reds players
Rotherham Titans players
London Scottish F.C. players
Coventry R.F.C. players
ASM Clermont Auvergne players
London Irish players
People educated at Bryanston School
Rugby union players from Oxford
Rugby union centres